In poetry, cadence describes the fall in pitch of the intonation of the voice, and its modulated inflection with the rise and fall of its sound.

Etymology
From Middle French cadence, and from Italian cadenza, and from Latin cadentia with the meaning to fall.

Cadence in poetry

In poetry cadence describes the rhythmic pacing of language to a resolution and was a new idea in 1915  used to describe the subtle rise and fall in the natural flow and pause of ordinary speech where the strong and weak beats of speech fall into a natural order restoring the audible quality to poetry as a spoken art. Cadence verse is non-syllabic resembling music rather than older metrical poetry with a rhythmic curve containing one or more stressed accents and roughly corresponding to the necessity of breathing, the cadence being more rapid and marked than in prose.

Legacy

The idea that cadence should be substituted for metre was at the heart of the Imagist credo according to T. E. Hulme.
Unrhymed cadence in Vers libre is built upon 'organic rhythm,' or the rhythm of the speaking voice with its necessity for breathing, rather than upon a strict metrical system .
Cadence in Free verse came to mean whatever the writer liked, some claiming verse and poetry had it, but prose did not, but for some it was synonymous with Free verse, where each poet has to find the cadence within himself.

See also

Vers libre
Free verse
Cadence (music)

References

Further reading

 Allen Charles- Cadenced Free Verse. College English Vol 9 Dept of English, University of Arizona 1948.
Charles O. Hartman, Free Verse: An Essay on Prosody, Northwestern University Press, 1980. 
 Smith James Harry The Reading of Poetry Houghton Mifflin New York 1939

External links
Read 'Nocturne in a Deserted Brickyard' a cadenced poem by Carl Sandburg
Charles Allen - Cadenced Free Verse essay

Poetic forms